Nkayi  is a district in the Bouenza Region of southern Republic of the Congo. The capital lies at Nkayi.

Towns and villages

Bouenza Department
Districts of the Republic of the Congo